Ceramoclasteropsis is a genus of fungi within the Capnodiaceae family.

References 

Capnodiaceae
Dothideomycetes genera